is a Japanese original net animation (ONA) series, created by Ryōsuke Takahashi and Sunrise, with character designs by Yusuke Kozaki. The series follows Yojiro Akizuki, the bearer of the legendary Moon Tear Sword, who is on a mission to seal a supernatural object known as the Head of the Conqueror, which has now appeared during the Boshin War. Yojiro will not rest until his mission is fulfilled, no matter what or who gets in his way.

Plot
The series is set in the Bakumatsu era, with the Shogunate being in its final years, and war fast approaching. When Yojiro Akizuki, a dark and mysterious mercenary, nears something supernatural with some kind of importance to him, the ornament on the end of his sword hilt waves in its direction, his eyes glow mysteriously, and he is driven to go after it. He comes across a traveling theater group who is out for revenge for the killing of the parents of the group's leader, and whose mysterious playwright likes to secretly help along events of history. Yojiro joins them to lend them his skill against their enemies, while dark conspiracy continues to follow behind him.

Characters

Main characters

He was once a close confidante, friend and bodyguard of the late Ryoma, whose assassination he failed to prevent and which continues to haunt him to the current day. During the midst of his quest to destroy the Head of the Conqueror, he visits Yokohama and happens to meet the Yuyama Troupe, an adventuring kabuki group, and its leader Kakunojo. While in the city, Yojiro senses the aura of the Head of the Conqueror within an auction held in the Shanghai Club, soon breaking through its confines in attempting to cut it in half. However, even if its head appeared to have been cut, the spirit of the elusive Head of the Conqueror was not destroyed and still remains, with Yojiro continuing in his quest to find and destroy it. Occasionally, Yojiro acts as the personal bodyguard to the Yuyama Troupe. He is shown to have some feelings of love for Kakunojo.

A young woman and leader of the Yuyama Troupe, Kakunojo's parents, shipping and wholesale merchants, were murdered by Hario, as part of the Ansei Purges for being a staunch supporter for the Emperor, when she was still a young child, and was saved from death in the same incident by the brave actions of her late father's acquaintance Zagashira and apprentice Ebisu. With her home destroyed in the same fire, Kakunojo, along with Zagashira and Ebisu, formed the Yuyama Troupe and visit various regions around the country to seek Hario, in order to exact revenge upon the murder of her parents. Their group was soon joined by Sotetsu, an intelligent playwright, and later by Shiranui and Kakashi, both of whom were attracted to the group's ideals. Her real past is that she was also in the same orphanage as Yojiro but was adopted. Later during the series, she develops strong feelings of love for Yojiro, noting that their destinies are intertwined. Lord Shoten says that the sword that calls to her is the "yang to Yojiro's Moon Tear Sword yin".

The extremely intelligent and mysterious playwright of the Yuyama Troupe, Sotetsu is respected by each member of the group, who call him Sensei. He works secretly to attain Lord Shoten's Head of the Conqueror, manipulating events behind the scenes, and is in business with the infamous Jubei early on in the story. He later joins Enomoto in rebuilding the republic to further his own plan.

Yuyama Troupe

An actor of the Yuyama Troupe under the stage name Seijūrō Yuyama, Shiranui joined the group after one of Sotetsu's plays saved him from being executed. He slept with a policeman's wife. The police killed his wife and framed him for murder. He enjoys visiting the red-light district and has feelings for Kotoha.

One of the actors of the Yuyama Troupe, Ebisu was an apprentice of Kakunojo's household, who had treated him very well. When the household was being burnt and Kakunojo's parents were murdered before his very eyes by Hario as part of the Ansei Purges, Ebisu attempted to protect Kakunojo, and while doing so, he was burnt by the resulting fire, forced to live the rest of his life with bandages covering his face and body.

The strongman of the Yuyama Troupe, Kakashi is a good-hearted person who joined the group for a similar reason to Shiranui.

Zagashira simply means the head of the troop. His real name remains unknown. The manager of the Yuyama Troupe, Zagashira looks after the group's accounts. He used to work for Kakunojo's father. Zagashira saved Kakunojo from the fire that destroyed her household.

One of the child actors of the Yuyama Troupe, Kobako, along with Benimaru, was saved by Yojiro from a near fatal incident, and are both grateful to him for saving their lives.

One of the child actors of the Yuyama Troupe, Benimaru, along with Kobako, was saved by Yojiro from a near fatal incident, and are both grateful to him for saving their lives.

Shogunate and Imperial forces

The chief of staff of the newly formed fully modernized Imperial Army (or the New Government Army) and a samurai from Satsuma. Under the authority of Prince Arisugawa, he was in charge of capturing Edo where the 15th Shogun Tokugawa Yoshinobu resides. Takamori is a firm believer in the privileges of the samurai class.

The chief of staff of the Shogun's Edo army and a native of Edo city. He was working desperately to avoid bloodshed in Edo. With support from the British and French representatives, he arranged a meeting with Takamori in Edo to negotiate for peace on behalf of the Shogun Tokugawa Yoshinobu. He was formerly the Navy Magistrate of the Shogun's Navy. Katsu was mentor to Ryoma (who initially attempted to kill him, however, instead became his bodyguard).

A famous liberal and progressive samurai from Tosa, Ryoma was greatly respected by Yojiro, who was his bodyguard and close confidant. Ryoma negotiated an alliance between Satsuma and Chōshū, two Imperialist clans who had traditionally been bitter rivals towards each other. However, he was later assassinated in a Kyoto inn in 1867.

A retainer of the Nagaoka clan in North East Japan, Kawai arrives in Yokohama to purchase two Gatling guns in order to ensure the armed neutrality between the Shogunate and Imperial forces that was maintained by the Nagaoka clan. During the Boshin War, Kawai fled to Aizu after the Nagaoka Province has fallen, but he died in the line of battle just as Enomoto's fleet left Shinagawa to assist in the war.

A dear friend of Katsu and part of the final Tokugawa Shogun who left for Ito in preparation for the Battle of Ueno.

The famous tactician who first met with Saigo to discuss the attack on Ueno. He was assassinated a year after the Battle of Ueno was won by the Imperial Army with the use of Armstrong breech-loading cannons.

Captain of the CSS Stonewall. He attempted to ambush Hijikata by pretending to surrender the CSS Stonewall to the Republic of Ezo. Also, he had to transport Yojiro to Ezo unharmed as a favor from Saigo. Due to the failure in his attempt, he and his men lost in the Battle of Miyako Bay. Yojiro and Hijikata reunite as they return to Hakodate.

Jubei's faction

A mysterious Yokohama merchant formerly known as Sennosuke Kuroiwa, Jubei was presumed to be dead after the fire at his company headquarters the Bronze Palace in 1861. Jubei mysteriously reappeared in 1868 in a secret auction inside the Shanghai Club trying to sell the Head of the Conqueror. He sent Hario to protect Kawai and the Gatling guns the latter bought during the same auction. Jubei seemed to know about the Ansei Purges, and was well acquainted with British merchant Glover, from whom he acquires his weapons. His death occurred when the Yuyama Troupe performed at the pier of Fort Shinagawa, while he was chained to a canoe by Ebisu and bombed by the elite British soldiers.

A swordsman who murdered Kakunojo's parents and attempted to kill her, whose face was forever to be remembered by Ebisu. Hario is a bearer of the ancient earth-splitting sword technique, which attempts to create a continuous fissure within the earth's surface as a result of the vertical movement of one's sword, but which is stopped with the application of water within its path. He later serves in Yokohama as Kawai's bodyguard, as ordered by Jubei, and is instantly recognized by Ebisu, who moves to inform the rest of the troupe and later traces him to an underground auction held in the Shanghai Club, where Hario had been accompanying Kawai. After witnessing Yojiro's attempt to destroy the Hasha no Kubi, Hario becomes very intrigued with Yojiro and attempts to find and kill him the next day, to the extent of even ignoring his job to protect Kawai and his Gatling guns. Later, Hario is cornered by Yojiro and the Yuyama Troupe in the midst of a sun-brazen wheat field. When they attempt to kill him, a sniper named Magozo, sent by Jubei, attempts to shoot him, and Hario soon dies.

A sniper who worked for Jubei, Magozo was first seen firing a critical shot at Hario, as per Jubei's orders. He was a descendant of the Saiga Ikki warrior clan, who once rebelled against Nobunaga Oda during the Sengoku period. He was stabbed through the chest by Yojiro during a play performed by the Yuyama Troupe at the Stone Crane Mansion.

A Scottish arms merchant and industrialist based in Nagasaki. He works closely with Jubei and often supplies him weapons, including Magozo's sniping rifle.

A sorcerer who worked for Jubei, Meifu was first seen in a dungeon as he uses the Head of the Conqueror to control Kurota, Kaen and Gensai in many attempts to kill Yojiro and obtain the Moon Tear Sword. He is killed by Sotetsu at Sunpu Castle, following a failed attempt to use the Head of the Conqueror to have Saigo and Katsu oppose each other against their will.

One of three highly-skilled samurais who were summoned by Jubei then controlled by Meifu using the Head of the Conqueror in many attempts to kill Yojiro and obtain the Moon Tear Sword. He is ultimately slashed by Yojiro at the Stone Crane Mansion, but then shot by Kanna when he attempts to reawaken.

One of three highly-skilled samurais who were summoned by Jubei then controlled by Meifu using the Head of the Conqueror in many attempts to kill Yojiro and obtain the Moon Tear Sword. He is ultimately slashed by Yojiro at the Stone Crane Mansion.

One of three highly-skilled samurais who were summoned by Jubei then controlled by Meifu using the Head of the Conqueror in many attempts to kill Yojiro and obtain the Moon Tear Sword. He is ultimately slashed by Yojiro at the Stone Crane Mansion.

Village of Koma

A well-respected high priest of the Village of Koma in modern day Saitama Prefecture. He is a direct descendant of the 3,000 men and women mission led by Xu Fu, the immortal mage to seal and dispose the Head of the Conqueror in Japan. He enjoys good food and simple village life.

Lord Shoten's caretaker and Yojiro's former mentor. He is the first to send Yojiro on a mission to seal the Head of the Conqueror after Yojiro released its spirit while at the Shanghai Club. He also sensed that Sotetsu bought the clay pot for an ulterior motive. He attempted to duel against Sotetsu, but Sotetsu escaped by rowing away in a canoe.

Enomoto's fleet
 

Captain of the flagship Kaiyō Maru, and former Shogunate ships Kaiten Maru and Banryū Maru. He is possessed by the soul of Lord Awa inside the clay pot housing the Head of the Conqueror, during a play performed by the Yuyama Troupe taking place at Fort Shinagawa. Under the influence of the Head of the Conqueror, Enomoto establishes the Republic of Ezo after his fleet successfully takes over Hakodate and Goryōkaku.

A French army officer who joined the fleet in support of Sotetsu's ideals of a revolution. Following the birth of the Republic of Ezo, he leaves the fleet when the crowd of people start behaving like a mob.

A resident doctor aboard the fleet who first saved Kakunojo from a traumatic state when Yojiro first confronted Enomoto and she accidentally knocked Yojiro into the sea, though Yojiro later survived that incident. Ryoun later assists Kakunojo and Tetsunosuke at Hakodate Hospital when the fleet took over Hakodate and Goryōkaku.

Shinsengumi's vice-commander. In the past, there was friendship with Yojiro in Kyoto, and they meet again during the Battle of Aizu. He joined the fleet after Sotetsu's cunning convincing in order to lead the ranks to take over Japan. Although he showed his success in the Battle of Shinkansen, he was shot to death by Kanna because he turned the banner against the Head of the Conqueror. In historical fact, it is believed he died after striking a stray bullet.

Hijikata's teenage page. He was ordered by Hijikata to take care of Kakunojo while at Hakodate Hospital. He escapes from Hakodate heading toward Hino, the hometown of Hijikata to deliver his master's photo and letter.

Minister of the Army. He leads an uprising to kill all merchants making money off the republic. He later sends Enomoto's subordinates to attack Okoma at a pier and ambush Shiranui and Kotoha at a restaurant.

Elite British soldiers

Born in London to a British royal Navy vice admiral father and a Japanese mother, formerly a tayū in Yoshiwara, Kanna was tasked with being the bodyguard of Katsu, as part of a request from Parkes, the head of British mission in Yokohama, and is an extremely talented fighter, armed with two guns, each of the Remington New Model Army Conversion type. He seems to harbor passionate and confused feelings for Kakunojo, who reminds him of his beautiful Japanese mother, whose desertion haunts him. He later becomes an elite British soldier, tasked with the dangerous mission to eliminate Enomoto.

One of four original elite British soldiers. She is the orphaned sister of Rook. Her preferred weapon is the crossbow. She was killed when Enomoto convinced Kanna to shoot her during the raid in the dungeon of the Goryōkaku base.

One of four original elite British soldiers. He is the oldest of the group. His preferred weapon is the staff. He was killed by Hijikata during the raid in the dungeon of the Goryōkaku base.

One of four original elite British soldiers. He is the largest of the group. His preferred weapons are smoke grenades. He was killed by Sotetsu during the raid in the dungeon of the Goryōkaku base.

One of four original elite British soldiers. He is the orphaned brother of Queen. His preferred weapons are throwing knives. He was killed by two of Enomoto's men during an attack on the Kaiyō Maru.

Other characters

A tayū, highest rank of the oiran, who is the most famed and influential of the Sekkakurō, a pleasure house located in the Yukaku, Yokohama's pleasure quarters. She rivals the famous Yokohama oiran of the time, Kiyu from Gankurō. Her influential clientele include Katsu and Parkes. Kotoha is also a staunch supporter of the Yuyama Troupe, and during a discussion with Sotetsu, arranged for the group to perform during a night at the Sekkakurō. She later works as a waitress at Hakodate, much to Shiranui's surprise.

The head of the British mission in Yokohama. He arranges for Kanna to be the bodyguard of Katsu first and Jubei later. He then arranges for Kanna to join the elite British soldiers in the dangerous mission to eliminate Enomoto.

One of two messengers sent to deliver a secret letter to form an alliance with the emperor, but are halted by Sotetsu on their way to Sunpu Castle. A sudden earthquake caused this letter to be undelivered, thus a stalemate to an era. He, along with Masumitsu, are later sent to deliver a message to not make Edo a battlefield, but they arrive there too late. It is thanks to their desperate action that the meeting between Saigo and Katsu became reality. Yamaoka survived during the Battle of Ueno.

One of two messengers sent to deliver a secret letter to form an alliance with the emperor, but are halted by Sotetsu on their way to Sunpu Castle. A sudden earthquake caused this letter to be undelivered, thus a stalemate to an era. He, along with Yamaoka, are later sent to deliver a message to not make Edo a battlefield, but they arrive there too late. It is thanks to their desperate action that the meeting between Saigo and Katsu became reality. Masumitsu died during the Battle of Ueno.

Ryoma's lover and Yojiro's friend. She was aware of the Head of the Conqueror always wandering around Ryoma when Yojiro was asked to be Ryoma's bodyguard. At the time that the Yuyama Troupe was disbanded, Oryo crosses paths with Sotetsu while leaving Yokohama. She gives a box of scripts to the troupe, where they resumed their performances in Edo.

Shinsengumi's first squad captain. He has a past with meeting Yojiro at the Sato Dojo when they were younger, but in the end he is held in Yojiro's arm due to gradual illness, leaving his will to Hijikata and taking his final breath. In historical fact, Okita leaves the world without knowing the death of Isami Kondō, but in this work he is informed of the fact from Yojiro.

One of three traveling geishas who encounters Yojiro and Kakunojo at the Utsunomiya Inn, where she secretly gives Yojiro a letter written by Lord Shoten, leading Yojiro to an underground shrine hidden behind a waterfall where the second Moon Tear Sword is guarded by the ghost warriors. Okoma is later seen at a cemetery outside the Goryōkaku base, tasked to deliver a letter to Katsu for Shiranui and Kotoha.

Anime
The series was broadcast between October 6, 2006, and April 6, 2007, on the Japanese Internet streaming channel, GyaO. The anime is licensed by Sentai Filmworks in North America, and they released the series to Blu-ray and DVD on September 4, 2012, for episodes 1-13 and November 27, 2012, for episodes 14–26.

Episodes

Notes

References
Specific
Oochi, Yoko, et al. (January 2007). "Bakumatsu Kikansetsu: I-RO-HA-NI-HO-HE-TO". Newtype USA. pp. 60–61.

General

External links
Official site 
Official production blog 
Official Sentai Filmworks site 

2006 anime ONAs
Anime series
Anime with original screenplays
Historical fantasy anime and manga
Samurai in anime and manga
Sentai Filmworks
Sunrise (company)